Robert Morris (15 July 1838 – 24 June 1917) was an Irish-American politician who served as the mayor of Denver, Colorado from 1881 to 1883.

References

 

Mayors of Denver
1838 births
1917 deaths
19th-century American politicians